Bad News Baseball, originally released as  in Japan, is a baseball game for the Nintendo Entertainment System. The goal for players is to defeat every other team in the game. Gameplay could continue indefinitely until this occurred.

Gameplay
The game lacks a season mode. Instead, in the one-player mode the player's goal was to defeat every other team featured in the game in the order of their choosing in a round robin style. Wins and losses were not recorded, and the player could continue playing indefinitely until all other teams were defeated. While this meant that there was no set schedule of games, pitchers did have a stamina rating that once depleted would take several games' worth of rest to recover from. In this way, the game simulated the idea of a pitching rotation.

On the initial screen, players can choose to play 1 or 2 player games, as well as spectator mode (CPU vs. CPU), a 1 or 2 player All-Star game, or enter a password. Passwords are given out after every game and record what teams the player has beat, as well as the pitcher's stamina levels.

Functionally, the game plays similarly to R.B.I. Baseball, but with a few notable fun exceptions. For example, the umpires are anthropomorphic rabbits, players become unconscious when they are forced out or knocked out by the ball, and there are different, more kid-friendly animations for events such as home runs and close plays at the plate. Similar to the Japanese League, the game will end in a tie after 12 innings.

Like in real baseball, typical gameplay includes pinch hitters and pinch runners, stolen bases, four types of pitches and players with different attributes. The game features two leagues, the Ultra (corresponding to National League cities) and the Super (American League cities). Neither the Ultra nor the Super league use the DH rule. At the end of the game each team's game statistics are tracked and the score by innings is displayed.

Bad News Baseball features 12 teams, each with imaginary rosters. Each team's roster consisted of 14 batters (8 starters and 6 reserves) as well as 6 pitchers (4 starters and 2 relievers though starters could be used in a relief role and vice versa). The player is able to customize the lineup order and fielding positions as well as choose their desired pitcher. Each player has different abilities based on their ratings which are related but not directly tied to their presented statistics and the teams have different strengths and weaknesses. The teams themselves correspond loosely to actual Major League Baseball teams. For example, the Oakland team has green and yellow uniforms, much like the real-life Oakland Athletics. However, no actual team nicknames are used, and rosters have no resemblance to their MLB counterparts. The game also boasted all-star teams for each of the two leagues, which the player could modify.

The game also features the ability to play as girls. In girls mode, the teams remain the same, but the rosters are completely different, effectively creating 12 new teams. This feat is achieved by holding Down and Left on Controller 1 and holding Up on controller 2 (while still holding Down+Left) and hitting the RESET button on the NES.

Teams Featured

Reception
Bad News Baseball generally received average reviews from critics. Japanese gaming magazine Famitsu rated the game a 25/40.

References

External links

Game guide from gamespot.com

1989 video games
Baseball video games
Nintendo Entertainment System games
Nintendo Entertainment System-only games
Tecmo games
Multiplayer and single-player video games
Video games developed in Japan
Video games scored by Keiji Yamagishi
Sports video games set in Canada
Sports video games set in the United States